Victor Elmaleh (pronounced el-MAHL-ay; November 27, 1918 – November 17, 2014) was a Moroccan-born American businessman and real estate developer. He was born in Mogador, now Essaouira, Morocco, the eldest of six siblings. He was among the first to import Volkswagens to the United States.

Biography
Elmaleh was born to a Jewish family in Mogador, now Essaouira, Morocco.  He was the eldest of six brothers. His surname was an Arabic-Moroccan name that his Sephardic Jewish forebears had adopted after fleeing the Spanish Inquisition to Morocco.

He came to the United States in 1925, and grew up in Bensonhurst and Borough Park in Brooklyn. He attended P.S. 48, and later majored in music at Brooklyn College. He then attended the University of Virginia.

He won the one-wall handball national doubles championship in 1951. At 49, he and Victor Niederhoffer won the national doubles championship. He continued to play squash and win tournaments at an advanced age. He enjoyed watercolor painting, creating 4,000 in his lifetime, some of which were exhibited in galleries.

He died on November 17, 2014 at Lenox Hill Hospital in Manhattan, New York City.

References

1918 births
2014 deaths
Moroccan emigrants to the United States
American male squash players
American male handball players
Jewish American sportspeople
20th-century Moroccan Jews
American real estate businesspeople
20th-century American businesspeople
Brooklyn College alumni
21st-century American Jews